Gitte Krogh  (born 13 May 1977) is a former Danish female football forward. She was part of the Denmark women's national football team.

She competed at the 1996 Summer Olympics, playing 3 matches.

See also
 Denmark at the 1996 Summer Olympics

References

External links
 
 
http://www.soccerpunter.com/players/292363-Gitte-Krogh
http://www.ussoccer.com/stories/2014/03/17/11/32/usa-opens-1999-womens-world-cup-with-3-0-victory-over-denmark-hamm-foudy-and-lilly-score-in-front-of
http://www.gettyimages.com/detail/news-photo/gitte-krogh-of-the-danish-womens-soccer-team-kicks-the-ball-news-photo/72305794#jul-1998-gitte-krogh-of-the-danish-womens-soccer-team-kicks-the-ball-picture-id72305794
http://isiphotos.photoshelter.com/image/I0000dEJRXv.ooVc

1977 births
Living people
VSK Aarhus (women) players
Danish women's footballers
Place of birth missing (living people)
Footballers at the 1996 Summer Olympics
Olympic footballers of Denmark
Women's association football forwards
1995 FIFA Women's World Cup players
Denmark women's international footballers
1999 FIFA Women's World Cup players